Lyn St. James (born Evelyn Gene Cornwall; March 13, 1947) is an American former race car driver. She competed in the IndyCar series, with eleven CART and five Indy Racing League starts to her name. St. James is one of nine women who have qualified for the Indianapolis 500, and became the first woman to win the Indianapolis 500 Rookie of the Year award (oldest to win the award at 45, a record she held 30 years until Jimmie Johnson won it when he was 46 in 2022). She also has two class victories at the 24 Hours of Daytona, and won the GTO class, partnering with Calvin Fish and Robby Gordon, at the 1990 12 Hours of Sebring. Additionally she has competed in endurance racing in Europe, including the 24 Hours of Le Mans and the 24 Hours of Nürburgring, at which her AMC Spirit AMX team  placed first and second in class in 1979.

St. James founded the Women in the Winner's Circle Foundation in 1994 and is a motivational speaker. She has served on the board of trustees of Kettering University, and since 2015, serves as an appeal panelist for NASCAR's National Motorsports Appeals Panel.

In 1986, she was driving a Ford Probe during the IMSA LA Times Grand Prix at Riverside International Raceway and was in a big accident involving both Chip Robinson and Doc Bundy.

Career

Achievements 
Lyn St. James has been invited to the White House on multiple occasions, meeting with Presidents Ronald Reagan, George H.W. Bush, and Bill Clinton.  She was also named by Sports Illustrated as among the “Top-100 Women Athletes of the Century." Working Woman Magazine added her to the “Top 350 Women who changed the world between 1976-1996.” In 1994, she was inducted into the Florida Sports Hall of Fame, and is only one of two women in it for auto racing. She was also President of the Women's Sports Foundation from 1990-1993.

Speed Records 
Lyn St. James became the first woman driver to reach over 200 mph on a race track. She drove a number of different cars including Aston Martin, Porsche, Ferrari, and Mazda, but for the majority of her career she drove a Ford Mustang. She used a Ford Thunderbird to break a closed course record for women with 227.32 mph.

Racing record

12 Hours of Sebring results

24 Hours of Le Mans results

American Open Wheel racing results
(key)

CART

IndyCar

Indianapolis 500

American Le Mans Series results

Personal
Lyn St. James was born Carol Gene Cornwall, but shortly after birth, her first name was changed to Evelyn, after her aunt. After her first marriage to John Carusso, she changed her name to Lyn Carusso. Eventually she would adopt the professional name Lyn St. James in her business and racing activities. She got the idea from name of actress Susan Saint James. Upon her divorce from Carusso, she legally changed her name to Lyn St. James.

References

External links
 Lyn St. James official website
 Driver Database stats
 

1947 births
Living people
People from Willoughby, Ohio
Indianapolis 500 drivers
Champ Car drivers
American female racing drivers
Indianapolis 500 Rookies of the Year
IndyCar Series drivers
Female IndyCar Series drivers
Kettering University
24 Hours of Le Mans drivers
Trans-Am Series drivers
Racing drivers from Ohio
World Sportscar Championship drivers
Women's Sports Foundation executives
21st-century American women
Team Pelfrey drivers